The CMR University School of Legal Studies, formerly CMR Law School, is a law school located in Bangalore, Karnataka, India. It is approved by the Bar Council of India, and it is a constituent college of CMR University, Bangalore.

Co-curricular programmes

CMR National Moot Court Competition 
The biennial national level moot court competition (2008, 2010) hosted by CMR Law School is one of the most widely contested moot court competitions, with law colleges from all over India participating in this event. Five Sitting Judges of the High Court of Karnataka preside over the finals of the moot court competition.

CMR National Cross Examination Competition 
This is a biannual event that is held by CMR law school the first of its kind in India. The first competition was held in 2009.

Rankings

CMR University School of Legal Studies was ranked tenth in Outlook Indias  "Top 30 Private Law Colleges In India" of 2022.

See also
 List of law schools in India

References

External links
 

Colleges in Bangalore
Law schools in Karnataka